Lathus-Saint-Rémy, commonly known as Lathus, is a commune in the Vienne department, and the region of Nouvelle-Aquitaine, western France.

Geography
The Salleron forms most of the commune's eastern border.

See also
Communes of the Vienne department

References

Communes of Vienne